Onward is the twenty seventh studio album and a double-album by British space rock band Hawkwind. It was released in April 2012 by Eastworld Recordings.

Track listing

 * - Bonus live tracks

Personnel
Hawkwind
Dave Brock – guitar, synthesizer, vocals, bass
Richard Chadwick – drums, vocals
Tim Blake – keyboards, theremin, bass
Mr. Dibs – bass, vocals
Niall Hone – bass, synthesis, sequencing, guitar
Jason Stuart – keyboards (12,13,14)
Huw Lloyd-Langton – guitar (2)

References

Hawkwind albums
2012 albums